100 Mile House is a district municipality located in the South Cariboo region of central British Columbia, Canada.

History 
100 Mile House was originally known as Bridge Creek House, named after the creek running through the area. It acquired its current name during the Cariboo Gold Rush where a roadhouse was constructed in 1862 at the  mark up the Old Cariboo Road from Lillooet.

In 1930, Lord Martin Cecil left England to come to 100 Mile House and manage the estate owned by his father, the 5th Marquess of Exeter. The estate's train stop on the Pacific Great Eastern (now BC Rail leased and operated by Canadian National) railway is to the west of town and called Exeter. The town, which at the time consisted of the roadhouse, a general store, a post office, telegraph office and a power plant, had a population of 12. The original road house burned down in 1937.

100 Mile House residents often go by the demonyms "Hundred Milers, Huncity"

100 Mile House is on Secwepemc unceded territory. The nearest Secwepemc band is the Tsq'escen, for whom a geographic reference point is the Canim Lake Reserve.

Demographics 

Religion 
According to the 2021 census, religious groups in 100 Mile House included:
Irreligion (1,035 persons or 58.0 percent)
Christianity (630 persons or 35.3 percent)
Sikhism (95 persons or 5.3 percent)

Economy 

At present, 100 Mile House is the primary service centre for the South Cariboo and has a population of approximately 2,000. The service area has a population roughly ten times the size of the town. It includes the communities of Lac la Hache, Forest Grove, Lone Butte, Horse Lake, Bridge Lake, 70 Mile House, Canim Lake, and 108 Mile Ranch, and is the largest residential centre between Kamloops and Williams Lake.

The primary industries of 100 Mile House are forestry and ranching. Log home building and tourism are also an important part of the community.

Tourism 
100 Mile House is a centre for outdoor activities and is becoming increasingly known for its richness of bird life. The surrounding area features hundreds of lakes for boating and fishing including 101 Mile Lake, 103 Mile Lake, Lac La Hache, Canim Lake, Horse Lake, Green Lake, Bridge Lake and Sheridan Lake. The Cariboo ski marathon attracts a large and international field of cross-country (Nordic) skiers.

The surrounding communities have various activities for residents and visiting tourists, including rodeos and an extensive trail system. This area is known for outdoor activities including hiking, snowmobiling, cross country skiing, and ATV riding. There are government campgrounds at Green Lake, Bridge Lake and Lac La Hache. There are also many private campsites around the area that also offer cabin and fishing boat rentals and RV hook-ups.

Transportation 

100 Mile House was located historically along the Cariboo Road. Until 2002, it was served by BC Rail's daily dayliner service between Vancouver and Prince George. Until 2013, 100 Mile House was served by Greyhound Canada. Today, the town is served by the 100 Mile House Regional Transit System and by Adventure Charters intercity bus service four times a week in each direction. The area is also served by BC Transit Health Connections. The town is home to the 100 Mile House Airport with no scheduled services and is located near the larger South Cariboo Regional Airport.

Locations 
 North of 100 Mile House is Lac la Hache, 150 Mile House, Williams Lake, and McLeese Lake.
 Also located north of 100 Mile House is Quesnel and Prince George.
 Southeast of 100 Mile House is the Interlakes area and Bridge Lake.
 South of the town is 70 Mile House, Clinton, Cache Creek, Spences Bridge, and Vancouver.

Climate 
100 Mile House has a humid continental climate (Köppen Dfb) with mild summers combined with cool nights, along with cold, but not very cold winters for its latitude.

Sports 
100 Mile House is home to the 100 Mile House Wranglers who play hockey in the Kootenay International Junior Hockey League. They are a junior 'B' team and play their home games at the South Cariboo Rec Centre.

See also 
 List of historic ranches in British Columbia

References

External links 
 
 

District municipalities in British Columbia
Geography of the Cariboo
Populated places in the Cariboo Regional District
1862 establishments in Canada
Populated places established in 1862